Gottlieb Bach (4 February 1900 – 15 March 1973) was a Danish long-distance runner. He competed in the marathon at the 1928 Summer Olympics.

References

External links
 

1900 births
1973 deaths
Athletes (track and field) at the 1928 Summer Olympics
Danish male long-distance runners
Danish male marathon runners
Olympic athletes of Denmark
Athletes from Copenhagen